The Miami Hurricanes football program has played in 42 bowl games, going 19–23 for a .452 winning percentage. Its most common bowl destination has been the Orange Bowl, where the 'Canes have appeared nine times and compiled a 6–3 record. Miami's most common opponent in bowl play has been Nebraska. The schools have met six times in bowl play, with the Hurricanes having a 4–2 record against the Cornhuskers. Miami's second most common opponent in bowl play has been Wisconsin who have been a thorn in Miami's side. The schools have met 3 times in bowl play with the Badgers winning all three of them.

References

Miami, Florida

Miami Hurricanes bowl games
Miami Hurricanes bowl games